The Jeondae·Everland Station is a light rail station located in Cheoin-gu, Yongin, close to Everland amusement park. It is the terminus station of the EverLine and opened on April 26, 2013.

Everland operates a free-of-charge shuttle bus from the station.

References

Seoul Metropolitan Subway stations
Railway stations opened in 2013
Metro stations in Yongin